Vladimir Braga (born 1953) is a Moldovan politician who was a member of the Parliament of Moldova.

Biography
Braga served as member of the Parliament of Moldova (in the Legislature 2005–2009) on the lists of the Electoral Bloc Democratic Moldova.

References

External links
Parlamentul Republicii Moldova

1953 births
Living people
Moldovan MPs 2005–2009
Electoral Bloc Democratic Moldova MPs